The dire wolf (Aenocyon dirus ) is an extinct canine. It is one of the most famous prehistoric carnivores in North America, along with its extinct competitor Smilodon. The dire wolf lived in the Americas and eastern Asia during the Late Pleistocene and Early Holocene epochs (125,000–9,500 years ago). The species was named in 1858, four years after the first specimen had been found. Two subspecies are recognized: Aenocyon dirus guildayi and Aenocyon dirus dirus. The largest collection of its fossils has been obtained from the Rancho La Brea Tar Pits in Los Angeles.

Dire wolf remains have been found across a broad range of habitats including the plains, grasslands, and some forested mountain areas of North America, the arid savanna of South America, and the steppes of eastern Asia. Dire wolf fossils have rarely been found north of 42°N latitude; there have been only five unconfirmed reports above this latitude. This range restriction is thought to be due to temperature, prey, or habitat limitations imposed by proximity to the Laurentide and Cordilleran ice sheets that existed at the time. However, the 2020 discovery of dire wolf fossils in northeast China indicates that dire wolves had crossed Beringia when it existed.

The dire wolf was about the same size as the largest modern gray wolves (Canis lupus): the Yukon wolf and the northwestern wolf. A.d.guildayi weighed on average  and A.d.dirus was on average . Its skull and dentition matched those of C.lupus, but its teeth were larger with greater shearing ability, and its bite force at the canine tooth was stronger than any known Canis species. These characteristics are thought to be adaptations for preying on Late Pleistocene megaherbivores, and in North America, its prey is known to have included western horses, ground sloths, mastodons, ancient bison, and camels. Its extinction occurred during the Quaternary extinction event along with its main prey species. Its reliance on megaherbivores has been proposed as the cause of its extinction, along with climatic change and competition with other species, or a combination of those factors. Dire wolves lived as recently as 9,500 years ago, according to dated remains.

Taxonomy

From the 1850s, the fossil remains of extinct large wolves were being found in the United States, and it was not immediately clear that these all belonged to one species. The first specimen of what would later become associated with Aenocyon dirus was found in mid-1854 in the bed of the Ohio River near Evansville, Indiana. The fossilized jawbone with cheek teeth was obtained by the geologist Joseph Granville Norwood from an Evansville collector, Francis A. Linck. The paleontologist Joseph Leidy determined that the specimen represented an extinct species of wolf and reported it under the name of Canis primaevus. Norwood's letters to Leidy are preserved along with the type specimen (the first of a species that has a written description) at the Academy of Natural Sciences of Philadelphia. In 1857, while exploring the Niobrara River valley in Nebraska, Leidy found the vertebrae of an extinct Canis species that he reported the following year under the name C.dirus. The name C.primaevus (Leidy 1854) was later renamed Canis indianensis (Leidy 1869) when Leidy found out that the name C.primaevus had previously been used by the British naturalist Brian Houghton Hodgson for the dhole.

In 1876 the zoologist Joel Asaph Allen discovered the remains of Canis mississippiensis (Allen 1876) and associated these with C.dirus (Leidy 1858) and Canis indianensis (Leidy 1869). As so little was found of these three specimens, Allen thought it best to leave each specimen listed under its provisional name until more material could be found to reveal their relationship. In 1908 the paleontologist John Campbell Merriam began retrieving numerous fossilized bone fragments of a large wolf from the Rancho LaBrea tar pits. By 1912 he had found a skeleton sufficiently complete to be able to formally recognize these and the previously found specimens under the name C.dirus (Leidy 1858). Because the rules of nomenclature stipulated that the name of a species should be the oldest name ever applied to it, Merriam therefore selected the name of Leidy's 1858 specimen, C.dirus. In 1915 the paleontologist Edward Troxell indicated his agreement with Merriam when he declared C.indianensis a synonym of C.dirus. In 1918, after studying these fossils, Merriam proposed consolidating their names under the separate genus Aenocyon (from ainos, 'terrible' and cyon, 'dog') to become Aenocyon dirus, but at that time not everyone agreed with this extinct wolf being placed in a new genus separate from the genus Canis. Canis ayersi (Sellards 1916) and Aenocyon dirus (Merriam 1918) were recognized as synonyms of C.dirus by the paleontologist Ernest Lundelius in 1972. All of the above taxa were declared synonyms of C.dirus in 1979, according to the paleontologist Ronald M. Nowak.

In 1984 a study by Björn Kurtén recognized a geographic variation within the dire wolf populations and proposed two subspecies: Canis dirus guildayi (named by Kurtén in honor of the paleontologist John E. Guilday) for specimens from California and Mexico that exhibited shorter limbs and longer teeth, and Canis dirus dirus for specimens east of the North American Continental Divide that exhibited longer limbs and shorter teeth. Kurtén designated a maxilla found in Hermit's Cave, New Mexico as representing the nominate subspecies C. d. dirus.

In 2021, a DNA study found the dire wolf to be a highly divergent lineage when compared with the extant wolf-like canines, and this finding is consistent with the previously proposed taxonomic classification of the dire wolf as genus Aenocyon (Ancient Greek: "terrible wolf") as proposed by Merriam in 1918.

Evolution
In North America, the canid family came into existence 40 million years ago, with the canine subfamily Caninae coming into existence about 32 million years ago. From the Caninae, the ancestors of the fox-like Vulpini and the dog-like Canini came into existence 9 million years ago. This group was first represented by Eucyon, and mostly by coyote-like Eucyon davisi that was spread widely across North America. From the Canini the Cerdocyonina, today represented by the South American canids, came into existence 6–5 million years ago. Its sister the wolf-like Canina came into existence 5 million years ago, however, they are likely to have originated as far back as 9 million years ago. Around 7 million years ago, the canines expanded into Eurasia and Africa, with Eucyon giving rise to the first of genus Canis in Europe. Around 4–3 million years ago C. chihliensis, the first wolf-sized member of Canis, arose in China and expanded to give rise to other wolf-like members across Eurasia and Africa. Members of genus Canis would later expand into North America.

The dire wolf evolved in North America. However, the ancestral lineage that gave rise to it is debated with two competing theories. The first theory is based on fossil morphology, which indicates an expansion of genus Canis from out of Eurasia led to the dire wolf. The second theory is based on DNA evidence, which indicates the dire wolf arose from an ancestral lineage that originated in the Americas and was separate from genus Canis.

Morphological evidence

Morphological evidence based on fossil remains indicates an expansion of genus Canis from out of Eurasia led to the dire wolf.

In 1974 RobertA.Martin proposed that the large North American wolf C.armbrusteri (Armbruster's wolf) was C.lupus. Nowak, Kurtén, and Annalisa Berta proposed that C.dirus was not derived from C.lupus. In 1987, a new hypothesis proposed that a mammal population could give rise to a larger form called a hypermorph during times when food was abundant, but when food later became scarce the hypermorph would either adapt to a smaller form or go extinct. This hypothesis might explain the large body sizes found in many Late Pleistocene mammals compared to their modern counterparts. Both extinction and speciationa process by which a new species splits from an older onecould occur together during periods of climatic extremes. Gloria D. Goulet agreed with Martin, proposing further that this hypothesis might explain the sudden appearance of C.dirus in North America and, judging from the similarities in their skull shapes, that C.lupus had given rise to the C.dirus hypermorph due to an abundance of game, a stable environment, and large competitors.

The three paleontologists Xiaoming Wang, Richard H. Tedford, and Ronald M. Nowak propose that C.dirus evolved from Canis armbrusteri, with Nowak stating that both species arose in the Americas and that specimens found in Cumberland Cave, Maryland, appear to be C.armbrusteri diverging into C.dirus. Nowak believed that Canis edwardii was the first appearance of the wolf in North America, and it appears to be close to the lineage which produced C. armbrusteri and C. dirus. Tedford believes that the early wolf from China, Canis chihliensis, may have been the ancestor of both C.armbrusteri and the gray wolf C.lupus. The sudden appearance of C.armbrusteri in mid-latitude North America during the Early Pleistocene 1.5 million years ago along with the mammoth suggests that it was an immigrant from Asia, with the gray wolf C.lupus evolving in Beringia later in the Pleistocene and entering mid-latitude North America during the Last Glacial Period along with its Beringian prey. In 2010 Francisco Prevosti proposed that C.dirus was a sister taxon to C.lupus.

C. dirus lived in the Late Pleistocene to the early Holocene (125,000–10,000 years before present or YBP) in North and South America. The majority of fossils from the eastern C.d.dirus have been dated 125,000–75,000YBP, but the western C.d.guildayi fossils are not only smaller in size but more recent; thus it has been proposed that C.d.guildayi derived from C.d.dirus. However, there are disputed specimens of C.dirus that date to 250,000YBP. Fossil specimens of C.dirus discovered at four sites in the Hay Springs area of Sheridan County, Nebraska, were named Aenocyon dirus nebrascensis (Frick 1930, undescribed), but Frick did not publish a description of them. Nowak later referred to this material as C.armbrusteri; then, in 2009, Tedford formally published a description of the specimens and noted that, although they exhibited some morphological characteristics of both C.armbrusteri and C.dirus, he referred to them only as C.dirus.

A fossil discovered in the Horse Room of the Salamander Cave in the Black Hills of South Dakota may possibly be C.dirus; if so, this fossil is one of the earliest specimens on record. It was catalogued as Canis cf. C.dirus (where cf. in Latin means confer, uncertain). The fossil of a horse found in the Horse Room provided a uranium-series dating of 252,000 yearsYBP and the Canis cf. dirus specimen was assumed to be from the same period. C.armbrusteri and C.dirus share some characteristics (synapomorphies) that imply the latter's descent from the former. The fossil record suggests C.dirus originated around 250,000YBP in the open terrain of the mid-continent before expanding eastward and displacing its ancestor C.armbrusteri. The first appearance of C.dirus would therefore be 250,000YBP in California and Nebraska, and later in the rest of the United States, Canada, Mexico, Venezuela, Ecuador, Bolivia, and Peru, but the identity of these earliest fossils is not confirmed.

In South America, C.dirus specimens dated to the Late Pleistocene were found along the north and west coasts, but none have been found in Argentina, an area that was inhabited by Canisgezi and Canis nehringi. Given their similarities and timeframes, it is proposed that Canis gezi was the ancestor of Canis nehringi. One study found that C.dirus was more evolutionarily derived compared with C.nehringi, and was larger in the size and construction of its lower molars for more efficient predation. For this reason, some researchers have proposed that C.dirus may have originated in South America. Tedford proposed that C.armbrusteri was the common ancestor for both the North and South American wolves. Later studies concluded that C.dirus and C.nehringi were the same species, and that C.dirus had migrated from North America into South America, making it a participant in the Great American Interchange. In 2018, a study found that Canis gezi did not fall under genus Canis and should be classified under the subtribe Cerdocyonina, however no genus was proposed.

DNA evidence

DNA evidence indicates the dire wolf arose from an ancestral lineage that originated in the Americas and was separate to genus Canis.

In 1992 an attempt was made to extract a mitochondrial DNA sequence from the skeletal remains of A.d.guildayi to compare its relationship to other Canis species. The attempt was unsuccessful because these remains had been removed from the LaBrea pits and tar could not be removed from the bone material. In 2014 an attempt to extract DNA from a Columbian mammoth from the tar pits also failed, with the study concluding that organic compounds from the asphalt permeate the bones of all ancient samples from the LaBrea pits, hindering the extraction of DNA samples.

In 2021, researchers sequenced the nuclear DNA (from the cell nucleus) taken from five dire wolf fossils dating from 13,000 to 50,000 years ago. The sequences indicate the dire wolf to be a highly divergent lineage which last shared a most recent common ancestor with the wolf-like canines 5.7 million years ago. The study also measured numerous dire wolf and gray wolf skeletal samples that showed their morphologies to be highly similar, which had led to the theory that the dire wolf and the gray wolf had a close evolutionary relationship. The morphological similarity between dire wolves and gray wolves was concluded to be due to convergent evolution. Members of the wolf-like canines are known to hybridize with each other but the study could find no indication of genetic admixture from the five dire wolf samples with extant North American gray wolves and coyotes nor their common ancestor. This finding indicates that the wolf and coyote lineages evolved in isolation from the dire wolf lineage.

The study proposes an early origin of the dire wolf lineage in the Americas, and that this geographic isolation allowed them to develop a degree of reproductive isolation since their divergence 5.7 million years ago. Coyotes, dholes, gray wolves, and the extinct Xenocyon evolved in Eurasia and expanded into North America relatively recently during the Late Pleistocene, therefore there was no admixture with the dire wolf. The long-term isolation of the dire wolf lineage implies that other American fossil taxa, including C. armbrusteri and C. edwardii, may also belong to the dire wolf's lineage. The study's findings are consistent with the previously proposed taxonomic classification of the dire wolf as genus Aenocyon.

Radiocarbon dating
The age of most dire wolf localities is determined solely by biostratigraphy, but biostratigraphy is an unreliable indicator within asphalt deposits. Some sites have been radiocarbon dated, with dire wolf specimens from the LaBrea pits dated in calendar years as follows: 82 specimens dated 13,000–14,000YBP; 40 specimens dated 14,000–16,000YBP; 77 specimens dated 14,000–18,000YBP; 37 specimens dated 17,000–18,000YBP; 26 specimens dated 21,000–30,000YBP; 40 specimens dated 25,000–28,000YBP; and 6specimens dated 32,000–37,000YBP. A specimen from Powder Mill Creek Cave, Missouri, was dated at 13,170YBP.

Description

The average dire wolf proportions were similar to those of two modern North American wolves: the Yukon wolf (Canis lupus pambasileus) and the Northwestern wolf (Canis lupus occidentalis). Some dire wolf specimens from Rancho LaBrea are smaller than this, and some are larger.

The dire wolf had smaller feet and a larger head when compared with a northern wolf of the same body size. These dimensions make the skull very massive. Its sagittal crest was higher, with the inion showing a significant backward projection, and with the rear ends of the nasal bones extending relatively far back into the skull. A connected skeleton of a dire wolf from Rancho LaBrea is difficult to find because the tar allows the bones to disassemble in many directions. Parts of a vertebral column have been assembled, and it was found to be similar to that of the modern wolf, with the same number of vertebrae.

Geographic differences in dire wolves were not detected until 1984, when a study of skeletal remains showed differences in a few cranio-dental features and limb proportions between specimens from California and Mexico (A.d.guildayi) and those found from the east of the Continental Divide (A.d.dirus). A comparison of limb size shows that the rear limbs of A.d.guildayi were 8% shorter than the Yukon wolf due to a significantly shorter tibia and metatarsus, and that the front limbs were also shorter due to their slightly shorter lower bones. With its comparatively lighter and smaller limbs and massive head, A.d.guildayi was not as well adapted for running as timber wolves and coyotes. A.d.dirus possessed significantly longer limbs than A.d.guildayi. The forelimbs were 14% longer than A.d.guildayi due to 10% longer humeri, 15% longer radii, and 15% longer metacarpals. The rear limbs were 10% longer than A.d.guildayi due to 10% longer femora and tibiae, and 15% longer metatarsals. A.d.dirus is comparable to the Yukon wolf in limb length. The largest A.d.dirus femur was found in Carroll Cave, Missouri, and measured .

A.d.guildayi is estimated to have weighed on average , and A.d.dirus weighed on average  with some specimens being larger, but these could not have exceeded  due to skeletal limits. These figures show the average dire wolf to be similar in size to the largest modern gray wolf.

The remains of a complete male A. dirus are sometimes easy to identify compared to other Canis specimens because the baculum (penis bone) of the dire wolf is very different from that of all other living canids.

Adaptation

Ecological factors such as habitat type, climate, prey specialization, and predatory competition have been shown to greatly influence gray wolf craniodental plasticity, which is an adaptation of the cranium and teeth due to the influences of the environment. Similarly, the dire wolf was a hypercarnivore, with a skull and dentition adapted for hunting large and struggling prey; the shape of its skull and snout changed across time, and changes in the size of its body have been correlated with climate fluctuations.

Paleoecology
The last glacial period, commonly referred to as the "Ice Age", spanned 125,000–14,500YBP and was the most recent glacial period within the current ice age, which occurred during the last years of the Pleistocene era. The Ice Age reached its peak during the Last Glacial Maximum, when ice sheets began advancing from 33,000YBP and reached their maximum limits 26,500YBP. Deglaciation commenced in the Northern Hemisphere approximately 19,000YBP and in Antarctica approximately 14,500YBP, which is consistent with evidence that glacial meltwater was the primary source for an abrupt rise in sea level 14,500YBP. Access into northern North America was blocked by the Wisconsin glaciation. The fossil evidence from the Americas points to the extinction mainly of large animals, termed Pleistocene megafauna, near the end of the last glaciation.

Coastal southern California from 60,000YBP to the end of the Last Glacial Maximum was cooler and with a more balanced supply of moisture than today. This region was unaffected by the climatic effects of the Wisconsin glaciation and is thought to have been an Ice Age refugium for animals and cold-sensitive plants. By 24,000YBP, the abundance of oak and chaparral decreased, but pines increased, creating open parklands similar to today's coastal montane/juniper woodlands. After 14,000YBP, the abundance of conifers decreased, and those of the modern coastal plant communities, including oak woodland, chaparral, and coastal sage scrub, increased. The Santa Monica Plain lies north of the city of Santa Monica and extends along the southern base of the Santa Monica Mountains, and 28,000–26,000YBP it was dominated by coastal sage scrub, with cypress and pines at higher elevations. The Santa Monica Mountains supported a chaparral community on its slopes and isolated coast redwood and dogwood in its protected canyons, along with river communities that included willow, red cedar, and sycamore. These plant communities suggest a winter rainfall similar to that of modern coastal southern California, but the presence of coast redwood now found  to the north indicates a cooler, moister, and less seasonal climate than today. This environment supported large herbivores that were prey for dire wolves and their competitors.

Prey

A range of animal and plant specimens that became entrapped and were then preserved in tar pits have been removed and studied so that researchers can learn about the past. The Rancho LaBrea tar pits located near Los Angeles in Southern California are a collection of pits of sticky asphalt deposits that differ in deposition time from 40,000 to 12,000YBP. The dire wolf has been made famous because of the large number of its fossils recovered there. Over 200,000 specimens (mostly fragments) have been recovered from the tar pits, with the remains ranging from Smilodon to squirrels, invertebrates, and plants. The time period represented in the pits includes the Last Glacial Maximum when global temperatures were  lower than today, the Pleistocene–Holocene transition (Bølling-Allerød interval), the Oldest Dryas cooling, the Younger Dryas cooling from 12,800 to 11,500YBP, and the American megafaunal extinction event 12,700YBP when 90 genera of mammals weighing over  became extinct.

Isotope analysis can be used to identify some chemical elements, allowing researchers to make inferences about the diet of the species found in the pits. Isotope analysis of bone collagen extracted from LaBrea specimens provides evidence that the dire wolf, Smilodon, and the American lion (Panthera atrox) competed for the same prey. Their prey included "yesterday's camel" (Camelops hesternus), the Pleistocene bison (Bison antiquus), the "dwarf" pronghorn (Capromeryx minor), the western horse (Equus occidentalis), and the "grazing" ground sloth (Paramylodon harlani) native to North American grasslands. The Columbian mammoth (Mammuthus columbi) and the American mastodon (Mammut americanum) were rare at LaBrea. The horses remained mixed feeders and the pronghorns mixed browsers, but at the Last Glacial Maximum and its associated shift in vegetation the camels and bison were forced to rely more heavily on conifers.

A study of isotope data of La Brea dire wolf fossils dated 10,000YBP provides evidence that the horse was an important prey species at the time, and that sloth, mastodon, bison, and camel were less common in the dire wolf diet. This indicates that the dire wolf was not a prey specialist, and at the close of the Late Pleistocene before its extinction it was hunting or scavenging the most available herbivores.

Dentition and bite force

When compared with the dentition of genus Canis members, the dire wolf was considered the most evolutionary derived (advanced) wolf-like species in the Americas. The dire wolf could be identified separately from all other Canis species by its possession of: "P2 with a posterior cusplet; P3 with two posterior cusplets; M1 with a mestascylid, entocristed, entoconulid, and a transverse crest extending from the metaconid to the hyperconular shelf; M2 with entocristed and entoconulid."

A study of the estimated bite force at the canine teeth of a large sample of living and fossil mammalian predators, when adjusted for the body mass, found that for placental mammals the bite force at the canines (in newtons/kilogram of body weight) was greatest in the dire wolf (163), followed among the modern canids by the four hypercarnivores that often prey on animals larger than themselves: the African hunting dog (142), the gray wolf (136), the dhole (112), and the dingo (108). The bite force at the carnassials showed a similar trend to the canines. A predator's largest prey size is strongly influenced by its biomechanical limits. The morphology of the dire wolf was similar to that of its living relatives, and assuming that the dire wolf was a social hunter, then its high bite force relative to living canids suggests that it preyed on relatively large animals. The bite force rating of the bone-consuming spotted hyena (117) challenged the common assumption that high bite force in the canines and the carnassials was necessary to consume bone.

A study of the cranial measurements and jaw muscles of dire wolves found no significant differences with modern gray wolves in all but 4 of 15 measures. Upper dentition was the same except that the dire wolf had larger dimensions, and the P4 had a relatively larger, more massive blade that enhanced slicing ability at the carnassial. The jaw of the dire wolf had a relatively broader and more massive temporalis muscle, able to generate slightly more bite force than the gray wolf. Due to the jaw arrangement, the dire wolf had less temporalis leverage than the gray wolf at the lower carnassial (m1) and lower p4, but the functional significance of this is not known. The lower premolars were relatively slightly larger than those of the gray wolf, and the dire wolf m1 was much larger and had more shearing ability. The dire wolf canines had greater bending strength than those of living canids of equivalent size and were similar to those of hyenas and felids. All these differences indicate that the dire wolf was able to deliver stronger bites than the gray wolf, and with its flexible and more rounded canines was better adapted for struggling with its prey.

Behavior
At La Brea, predatory birds and mammals were attracted to dead or dying herbivores that had become mired, and then these predators became trapped themselves. Herbivore entrapment was estimated to have occurred once every fifty years, and for every instance of herbivore remains found in the pits there were an estimated ten carnivores. A.d.guildayi is the most common carnivoran found at LaBrea, followed by Smilodon. Remains of dire wolves outnumber remains of gray wolves in the tar pits by a ratio of five to one. During the Last Glacial Maximum, coastal California, with a climate slightly cooler and wetter than today, is thought to have been a refuge, and a comparison of the frequency of dire wolves and other predator remains at LaBrea to other parts of California and North America indicates significantly greater abundances; therefore, the higher dire wolf numbers in the LaBrea region did not reflect the wider area. Assuming that only a few of the carnivores that were feeding became trapped, it is likely that fairly sizeable groups of dire wolves fed together on these occasions.

The difference between the male and female of a species apart from their sex organs is called sexual dimorphism, and in this regard little variance exists among the canids. A study of dire wolf remains dated 15,360–14,310YBP and taken from one pit that focused on skull length, canine tooth size, and lower molar length showed little dimorphism, similar to that of the gray wolf, indicating that dire wolves lived in monogamous pairs. Their large size and highly carnivorous dentition supports the proposal that the dire wolf was a predator that fed on large prey. To kill ungulates larger than themselves, the African wild dog, the dhole, and the gray wolf depend on their jaws as they cannot use their forelimbs to grapple with prey, and they work together as a pack consisting of an alpha pair and their offspring from the current and previous years. It can be assumed that dire wolves lived in packs of relatives that were led by an alpha pair. Large and social carnivores would have been successful at defending carcasses of prey trapped in the tar pits from smaller solitary predators, and thus the most likely to become trapped themselves. The many A.d.guildayi and Smilodon remains found in the tar pits suggests that both were social predators.

All social terrestrial mammalian predators prey mostly on terrestrial herbivorous mammals with a body mass similar to the combined mass of the social group members attacking the prey animal. The large size of the dire wolf provides an estimated prey size in the  range. Stable isotope analysis of dire wolf bones provides evidence that they had a preference for consuming ruminants such as bison rather than other herbivores but moved to other prey when food became scarce, and occasionally scavenged on beached whales along the Pacific coast when available. A pack of timber wolves can bring down a  moose that is their preferred prey, and a pack of dire wolves bringing down a bison is conceivable. Although some studies have suggested that because of tooth breakage, the dire wolf must have gnawed bones and may have been a scavenger, its widespread occurrence and the more gracile limbs of the dire wolf indicate a predator. Like the gray wolf today, the dire wolf probably used its post-carnassial molars to gain access to marrow, but the dire wolf's larger size enabled it to crack larger bones.

Tooth breakage

Tooth breakage is related to a carnivore's behavior. A study of nine modern carnivores found that one in four adults had suffered tooth breakage and that half of these breakages were of the canine teeth. The most breakage occurred in the spotted hyena that consumes all of its prey including the bone; the least breakage occurred in the African wild dog, and the gray wolf ranked in between these two. The eating of bone increases the risk of accidental fracture due to the relatively high, unpredictable stresses that it creates. The most commonly broken teeth are the canines, followed by the premolars, carnassial molars, and incisors. Canines are the teeth most likely to break because of their shape and function, which subjects them to bending stresses that are unpredictable in both direction and magnitude. The risk of tooth fracture is also higher when killing large prey.

A study of the fossil remains of large carnivores from LaBrea pits dated 36,000–10,000YBP shows tooth breakage rates of 5–17% for the dire wolf, coyote, American lion, and Smilodon, compared to 0.5–2.7% for ten modern predators. These higher fracture rates were across all teeth, but the fracture rates for the canine teeth were the same as in modern carnivores. The dire wolf broke its incisors more often when compared to the modern gray wolf; thus, it has been proposed that the dire wolf used its incisors more closely to the bone when feeding. Dire wolf fossils from Mexico and Peru show a similar pattern of breakage. A 1993 study proposed that the higher frequency of tooth breakage among Pleistocene carnivores compared with living carnivores was not the result of hunting larger game, something that might be assumed from the larger size of the former. When there is low prey availability, the competition between carnivores increases, causing them to eat faster and thus consume more bone, leading to tooth breakage. As their prey became extinct around 10,000 years ago, so did these Pleistocene carnivores, except for the coyote (which is an omnivore).

A later La Brea pits study compared tooth breakage of dire wolves in two time periods. One pit contained fossil dire wolves dated 15,000YBP and another dated 13,000YBP. The results showed that the 15,000YBP dire wolves had three times more tooth breakage than the 13,000YBP dire wolves, whose breakage matched those of nine modern carnivores. The study concluded that between 15,000 and 14,000YBP prey availability was less or competition was higher for dire wolves and that by 13,000YBP, as the prey species moved towards extinction, predator competition had declined and therefore the frequency of tooth breakage in dire wolves had also declined.

Carnivores include both pack hunters and solitary hunters. The solitary hunter depends on a powerful bite at the canine teeth to subdue their prey, and thus exhibits a strong mandibular symphysis. In contrast, a pack hunter, which delivers many shallower bites, has a comparably weaker mandibular symphysis. Thus, researchers can use the strength of the mandibular symphysis in fossil carnivore specimens to determine what kind of hunter it wasa pack hunter or a solitary hunterand even how it consumed its prey. The mandibles of canids are buttressed behind the carnassial teeth to enable the animals to crack bones with their post-carnassial teeth (molars M2 and M3). A study found that the mandible buttress profile of the dire wolf was lower than that of the gray wolf and the red wolf, but very similar to the coyote and the African hunting dog. The dorsoventrally weak symphyseal region (in comparison to premolars P3 and P4) of the dire wolf indicates that it delivered shallow bites similar to its modern relatives and was therefore a pack hunter. This suggests that the dire wolf may have processed bone but was not as well adapted for it as was the gray wolf. The fact that the incidence of fracture for the dire wolf reduced in frequency in the Late Pleistocene to that of its modern relatives suggests that reduced competition had allowed the dire wolf to return to a feeding behavior involving a lower amount of bone consumption, a behavior for which it was best suited.

The results of a study of dental microwear on tooth enamel for specimens of the carnivore species from LaBrea pits, including dire wolves, suggest that these carnivores were not food-stressed just before their extinction. The evidence also indicated that the extent of carcass utilization (i.e., amount consumed relative to the maximum amount possible to consume, including breakup and consumption of bones) was less than among large carnivores today. These findings indicates that tooth breakage was related to hunting behavior and the size of prey.

Climate impact
Past studies proposed that changes in dire wolf body size correlated with climate fluctuations. A later study compared dire wolf craniodental morphology from four LaBrea pits, each representing four different time periods. The results are evidence of a change in dire wolf size, dental wear and breakage, skull shape, and snout shape across time. Dire wolf body size had decreased between the start of the Last Glacial Maximum and near its ending at the warm Allerød oscillation. Evidence of food stress (food scarcity leading to lower nutrient intake) is seen in smaller body size, skulls with a larger cranial base, and shorter snout (shape neoteny and size neoteny), and more tooth breakage and wear. Dire wolves dated 17,900YBP showed all of these features, which indicates food stress. Dire wolves dated 28,000YBP also showed to a degree many of these features but were the largest wolves studied, and it was proposed that these wolves were also suffering from food stress and that wolves earlier than this date were even bigger in size. Nutrient stress is likely to lead to stronger bite forces to more fully consume carcasses and to crack bones, and with changes to skull shape to improve mechanical advantage. North American climate records reveal cyclic fluctuations during the glacial period that included rapid warming followed by gradual cooling, called Dansgaard–Oeschger events. These cycles would have caused increased temperature and aridity, and at LaBrea would have caused ecological stress and therefore food stress. A similar trend was found with the gray wolf, which in the Santa Barbara basin was originally massive, robust, and possibly convergent evolution with the dire wolf, but was replaced by more gracile forms by the start of the Holocene.

Competitors

Just before the appearance of the dire wolf, North America was invaded by the Canis subgenus Xenocyon (ancestor of the Asian dhole and the African hunting dog) that was as large as the dire wolf and more hypercarnivorous. The fossil record shows them as rare, and it is assumed that they could not compete with the newly derived dire wolf. Stable isotope analysis provides evidence that the dire wolf, Smilodon, and the American lion competed for the same prey. Other large carnivores included the extinct North American giant short-faced bear (Arctodus simus), the modern cougar (Puma concolor), the Pleistocene coyote (Canis latrans), and the Pleistocene gray wolf that was more massive and robust than today. These predators may have competed with humans who hunted for similar prey.

Specimens that have been identified by morphology as Beringian wolves (C.lupus) and radiocarbon dated 25,800–14,300 YBP have been found in the Natural Trap Cave at the base of the Bighorn Mountains in Wyoming, in the western United States. The location is directly south of what would at that time have been a division between the Laurentide Ice Sheet and the Cordilleran Ice Sheet. A temporary channel between the glaciers may have existed that allowed these large, Alaskan direct competitors of the dire wolf, which were also adapted for preying on megafauna, to come south of the ice sheets. Dire wolf remains are absent north of the 42°Nlatitude in North America, therefore, this region would have been available for Beringian wolves to expand south along the glacier line. How widely they were then distributed is not known. These also became extinct at the end of the Late Pleistocene, as did the dire wolf.

After arriving in eastern Eurasia, the dire wolf would have likely faced competition from the area's most dominant, widespread predator, the eastern subspecies of cave hyena (Crocuta crocuta ultima). Competition with this species may have kept Eurasian dire wolf populations very low, leading to the paucity of dire wolf fossil remains in this otherwise well-studied fossil fauna.

Range

Dire wolf remains have been found across a broad range of habitats including the plains, grasslands, and some forested mountain areas of North America, the arid savannah of South America, and the steppes of eastern Asia. The location of these fossil remains suggests that dire wolves lived predominantly in the open lowlands along with their prey the large herbivores. Dire wolf remains are not often found at high latitudes in North America. This lack of fossils was used as evidence that the dire wolves did not migrate east via Beringia until the discovery of Asian dire wolf remains in 2020.

In the United States, dire wolf fossils have been reported in Arizona, California, Florida, Idaho, Indiana, Kansas, Kentucky, Missouri, Nebraska, New Mexico, Oregon, Pennsylvania, South Carolina, South Dakota, Texas, Utah, Virginia, West Virginia, Wyoming, and Nevada. The identity of fossils reported farther north than California is not confirmed. There have been five reports of unconfirmed dire wolf fossils north of 42°Nlatitude at Fossil Lake, Oregon (125,000–10,000YBP), American Falls Reservoir, Idaho (125,000–75,000YBP), Salamander Cave, South Dakota (250,000YBP), and four closely grouped sites in northern Nebraska (250,000YBP). This suggests a range restriction on dire wolves due to temperature, prey, or habitat. The major fossil-producing sites for A.d.dirus are located east of the Rocky Mountains and include Friesenhahn Cave, near San Antonio, Texas; Carroll Cave, near Richland, Missouri; and Reddick, Florida.

Localities in Mexico where dire wolf remains have been collected include ElCedazo in Aguascalientes, Comondú Municipality in Baja California Sur, ElCedral in San Luis Potosí, ElTajo Quarry near Tequixquiac, state of Mexico, Valsequillo in Puebla, Lago de Chapala in Jalisco, Loltun Cave in Yucatán, Potrecito in Sinaloa, San Josecito Cave near Aramberri in Nuevo León and Térapa in Sonora. The specimens from Térapa were confirmed as A.d.guildayi. The finds at San Josecito Cave and ElCedazo have the greatest number of individuals from a single locality.

In South America, dire wolves have been dated younger than 17,000 YBP and have been reported from five localities: Muaco in the western Falcón state of Venezuela, Talara Province in Peru, Monagas state in eastern Venezuela, the Tarija Department in Bolivia, and Ecuador. If the dire wolf originated in North America, the species likely dispersed into South America via the Andean corridor, a proposed pathway for temperate mammals to migrate from Central to South America because of the favorable cool, dry, and open habitats that characterized the region at times. This most likely happened during a glacial period because the pathway then consisted of open, arid regions and savanna, whereas during inter-glacial periods it would have consisted of tropical rain forest.

In 2020, a fossil mandible from a dire wolf was found in the vicinity of Harbin, northeastern China. The fossil was taxonomically described and dated 40,000 YBP. This discovery challenges previous theories that the cold temperatures and ice sheets at northern latitudes in North America would be a barrier for dire wolves, which was based on no dire wolf fossils being found above the 42° latitude in North America. It is proposed that the dire wolf followed migrating prey from mid-latitude North America then across  Beringia into Eurasia.

Extinction

During the Quaternary extinction event around 12,700YBP, 90genera of mammals weighing over  became extinct. The extinction of the large carnivores and scavengers is thought to have been caused by the extinction of the megaherbivore prey upon which they depended. The cause of the extinction of the megafauna is debated but has been attributed to the impact of climatic change, competition with other species including overexploitation by newly arrived human hunters, or a combination of both. One study proposes that several extinction models should be investigated because so little is known about the biogeography of the dire wolf and its potential competitors and prey, nor how all these species interacted and responded to the environmental changes that occurred at the time of extinction.

Ancient DNA and radiocarbon data indicate that local genetic populations were replaced by others within the same species or by others within the same genus. Both the dire wolf and the Beringian wolf went extinct in North America, leaving only the less carnivorous and more gracile form of the wolf to thrive, which may have outcompeted the dire wolf. One study proposes an early origin of the dire wolf lineage in the Americas which led to its reproductive isolation, such that when coyotes, dholes, gray wolves, and Xenocyon expanded into North America from Eurasia in the Late Pleistocene there could be no admixture with the dire wolf. Gray wolves and coyotes may have survived due to their ability to hybridize with other canids – such as the domestic dog – to acquire traits that resist diseases brought by taxa arriving from Eurasia. Reproductive isolation may have prevented the dire wolf from acquiring these traits.

Dire wolf remains having the youngest geological ages are dated at 9,440YBP at Brynjulfson Cave, Boone County, Missouri, 9,860YBP at Rancho La Brea, California, and 10,690YBP at La Mirada, California. Dire wolf remains have been radiocarbon dated to 8,200YBP from Whitewater Draw in Arizona, However, one author has stated that radiocarbon dating of bone carbonate is unreliable.

See also

 Beringian wolf
 Pleistocene wolf
 List of North American animals extinct in the Holocene

Notes

References

Works cited

External links

 For younger readers – Dire Wolf by Marc Zabludoff, Marshall Cavendish, 2009
 The Evansville Dire Wolf
 Information on the dire wolf from the Illinois State Museum

Canina (subtribe)
Prehistoric canines
Pleistocene carnivorans
Holocene extinctions
Pleistocene first appearances
Pleistocene mammals of North America
Pleistocene mammals of South America
Pleistocene mammals of Asia
Fossil taxa described in 1858
Mammals described in 1858
Apex predators